The Cayemite long-tailed amphisbaena (Amphisbaena caudalis) is a worm lizard species in the family Amphisbaenidae. It is endemic to Haiti.

References

Amphisbaena (lizard)
Reptiles described in 1928
Taxa named by Doris Mable Cochran
Endemic fauna of Haiti
Reptiles of Haiti